The Golden Gate score was composed by Elliot Goldenthal in 1993 and released in 1994 for the film Golden Gate.

Track listing 
 "Golden Gate" (03:34)
 "The Women Cries" (03:33)
 "Between Bridge and Water" (01:54)
 "Tender Deception" (03:34)
 "Bopathonix Hex" (02:48)
 "The Woman Warrior" (02:30)
 "The Softest Heart" (03:45)
 "The Moon Watches" (01:43)
 "Whisper Dance" (01:51)
 "Kwan Ying" (02:47)
 "Motel Street Meltdown" (01:24)
 "Judgement on Mason Street" (02:03)
 "Write It As Time" (00:28)
 "Between Bridge and Sky" (02:51)

Crew/credit
Music composed by Elliot Goldenthal
Music produced by Matthias Gohl
Orchestrated by Elliot Goldenthal and Robert Elhai
Conducted by Jonathan Sheffer
Recorded and mixed by Steve McLaughlin and Bill Emmons

References

External links
 

Film scores
1994 soundtrack albums
Elliot Goldenthal soundtracks
Drama film soundtracks